Gaedia is a genus of parasitic flies in the family Tachinidae. There are at least four described species in Gaedia.

Species
These four species belong to the genus Gaedia:
 Gaedia connexa (Meigen, 1824)
 Gaedia distincta Egger, 1861
 Gaedia hispanica Mesnil, 1953
 Gaedia lauta Richter, 1969

References

Further reading

 
 
 
 

Tachinidae
Articles created by Qbugbot